The British Overseas School (BOS) is a selective coeducational, British school in Karachi, Pakistan, which offers classes ranging from Pre-Nursery through to IGCSE.

Introduction 

Founded in 1958 as a non-profit organisation, BOS imparts a rigorous British curriculum with UK qualified staff. Over the years BOS has evolved into a fully integrated Primary and Secondary School leading to International General Certificate of Secondary Education (IGCSE) and A Level Years 7–13, following the British system. The secondary school is an independent registered Edexcel Examination Centre.

Management

The patron of the British Overseas School Association is Her Britannic Majesty's High Commissioner in Islamabad.
The school is managed by a board of 12 governors that includes 4 permanent representatives: the British Deputy High Commissioner in Karachi, the Chairperson of UKAP, the Director of the British Council, the Principal, and 4 elected parent representatives.

Curriculum 

BOS, at the secondary level, is geared towards preparing students for the IGCSE, Advanced Subsidiary Level, and Advanced Level examinations.

The curriculum of the British Overseas Secondary School is based on the National Curriculum Programmes of Study and recognised UK Examination Board Edexcel syllabus up to and including Post-16 Examinations. Subjects taught at BOS include Physics, Chemistry, Mathematics, Biology, Urdu, English Literature, English Language, Economics, History, Art, Geography, ICT and French.

Extracurricular activities
 Rowing
 Cricket
 Football
 Basketball
 Badminton
 Science Club
 Debating Society
 Maths Club
 Table Tennis

Head students 
The Secondary School offers students in the Sixth Form the opportunity to take up positions of responsibility within the School.
The Head Boy and Head Girl are prominent members of the School community, taking a leading role on the Student Council, acting as role models for younger students and as ambassadors for the School. They represent the student body within the School and the School itself at outside events.

House system 
Four students have the opportunity to be head of their houses. This involves them in the organisation of their house members for activity days and sports day.

The four school houses are:

  Vikings
  Spartans
  Mughals
  Iroquois

Children are placed in the same house as their siblings; those who have no siblings at BOS are randomly distributed between the houses.

References

Educational institutions established in 1958
Schools in Karachi
Private schools in Pakistan
British international schools in Pakistan
1958 establishments in Pakistan